Kevin Wilson may refer to:

 Kevin Bloody Wilson (born 1947), Australian comedian
 Kevin Wilson (American football) (born 1961), American football coach
 Kevin Wilson (footballer, born 1961), Northern Irish footballer
 Kevin Wilson (footballer, born 1976), Jamaican footballer
 Kevin Wilson (sailor) (born 1923), American Olympic sailor
 Kevin Wilson (skier) (born 1959), Puerto Rican Olympic skier
 Kevin Wilson (writer), American writer
 Kevin J. Wilson, Australian actor
 Kevin Wilson (game designer), American designer of board games and role-playing games
 Kevin Wilson Jr., American filmmaker
 Kevin Wilson (Ackley Bridge), fictional character

See also
 Kelvin Wilson (born 1985), English footballer